KWYZ (1230 AM) is a U.S. radio station licensed to serve Everett, Washington.  The station, which began broadcasting in 1957, is currently owned by Radio Hankook, Inc.  Jean J. Suh, the owner of Radio Hankook, is a pioneer in Korean-language radio programming in the United States.

Programming
KWYZ broadcasts a mix of Korean language programming to the northern Seattle metropolitan area in a simulcast partnership with sister station KSUH (1450 AM). In addition to South Korean popular music (also known as "K-pop"), Radio Hankook airs up to six hours of daily talk radio programming, including local and South Korean news, information for recently-arrived immigrants from South Korea, and community affairs.  Other programming includes a program for children in both Korean and English plus a short twice-daily show for all ages that aims to teach basic English language skills.

History

Launch as KQTY
This station signed on the air in June 1957 as KQTY broadcasting with 250 watts of power on a frequency of 1230 kHz.  KQTY was originally licensed to the Snohomish County Broadcasting Company which, along with stations in California, North Dakota, and Montana, was part of the Walter N. "Wally" Nelskog stations group.  In 1960, the station was granted a construction permit by the FCC to increase its daytime signal power to 1,000 watts while maintaining a 250 watt signal at night.

Change to KWYZ
On April 1, 1962, the station was acquired by the Snohomish County Broadcasting Corporation,  with Cliff Hansen as President and George Aller as Vice President. The new owners had the FCC change the station's call sign to KWYZ. This situation remained stable until February 16, 1972, when the Snohomish County Broadcasting Corporation was acquired by Robert Brown. In June 1974, the new owners dropped the station's middle of the road music format in favor of country music. In May 1975, Brown changed the name of the license holder to Prime Time Broadcasting, Inc.

KWYZ today
In March 1999, Quality Broadcasting Corporation agreed to sell KWYZ to Jean J. Suh, doing business as Radio Hankook, for a reported price of $480,000.  The deal was approved by the FCC on April 27, 1999, and the transaction was consummated on August 3, 1999. Until this deal was consummated, KWYZ maintained its traditional country music format.  Suh applied to the FCC in October 2002 to transfer the broadcast license for this station to her company, Radio Hancook, Inc.  The transfer was approved by the FCC on November 15, 2002, and the transaction was consummated on December 1, 2003.

Jean J. Suh worked for five years as an actress as South Korea's Korean Broadcasting System before emigrating to the United States in 1964. While studying at Columbia College Hollywood in 1965, Suh began hosting a 30-minute weekly program of music and news in Korean on a Los Angeles radio station. In 1966 the program was extended to one hour per week and in 1967 to two hours each weekday.  In 1970, Suh and two financial partners launched an independent Korean-language radio station in Los Angeles, the first in the United States.  Suh purchased KKBY (1450 AM, now KSUH) in 1997 and KWYZ in 1999 to cover the southern and northern halves of the greater Seattle metropolitan area, respectively, as Korean-language "Radio Hankook".

Controversy

Studio location
Faced with mounting debts and financial difficulties, Radio Hankook owner Jean J. Suh moved KWYZ and sister station KSUH out of their rented studios in a commercial area of Federal Way, Washington, to her private residence in May 2000.  This move brought on complaints from neighbors, visits from city code enforcement officers, and a public campaign by Radio Hankook to force the city to allow the studios to remain in Suh's home. Ultimately, the city prevailed over increasing community resistance and the stations moved out of the home in late April 2001.

FCC issues
During a series of inspections conducted by FCC agents from March 2001 to November 2001, they found that KWYZ had failed to "have operational Emergency Alert System (EAS) equipment" and "to conduct required monthly and weekly EAS tests" and had failed to "post the ASR number on or near the base of" its broadcast tower in violation of FCC rules as well as finding similar violations by sister station KSUH.  After a January 2002 notice of these violations, licensee Jean J. Suh told the FCC that the station had modified its EAS equipment for automatic operation and that she did not own the KSUH tower but was leasing it from the station's previous license holder.  The FCC issued a "notice of apparent liability" against Suh for violations by KWYZ and KSUH on August 28, 2002, for a combined total of $22,000. After determining that Suh did not in fact own the KSUH tower, they reduced the penalty to $10,000 in late August 2003.

References

External links
 

Asian-American culture in Seattle
WYZ
Korean-language radio stations in the United States
Radio stations established in 1957
Everett, Washington
1957 establishments in Washington (state)
WYZ
Mass media in Snohomish County, Washington
ko:라디오한국